The La Crosse State Teachers College Training School Building was a building used to educate teachers at the University of Wisconsin–La Crosse in La Crosse, Wisconsin. The building is at 1615 State Street in La Crosse. The present building was built in 1940 and was known was the Campus School.

The Campus School continued until 1973, when it closed and was renamed Morris Hall in honor of Thomas Morris, who was instrumental in the establishment of the University of Wisconsin–La Crosse.

References

Sources
 Recollections 1909–1973 Campus School—University of Wisconsin–La Crosse, Susan Hessel, 1992, the University of Wisconsin–La Crosse Foundation. Courtesy of the La Crosse Public Library archives.

University and college buildings on the National Register of Historic Places in Wisconsin
Buildings and structures in La Crosse, Wisconsin
University of Wisconsin–La Crosse
National Register of Historic Places in La Crosse County, Wisconsin
School buildings completed in 1940
1940 establishments in Wisconsin